Ballet shoes are lightweight shoes designed specifically for ballet dancing.

Ballet shoes may also refer to:
 Ballet Shoes (film), a 2007 television movie
 Ballet Shoes (novel), a book by Noel Streatfeild
 Ballet Shoes (TV serial), a 1975 television serial
 Pointe shoes, worn by ballet dancers while performing en pointe